Milton Kraus (June 26, 1866 – November 18, 1942) was an American lawyer and politician who served three terms as a U.S. Representative from Indiana from 1917 to 1923.

Biography 
Born in Kokomo, Indiana to German-Jewish parents, Kraus attended the common and high schools.
He was graduated from the law department of the University of Michigan at Ann Arbor in 1886.
He was admitted to the bar in 1887 and commenced practice in Peru, Indiana. He organized a company of volunteers for the Spanish–American War.

Political career 
He was a presidential elector in the 1908 presidential election.

Kraus was elected as a Republican to the Sixty-fifth, Sixty-sixth, and Sixty-seventh Congresses (March 4, 1917 – March 3, 1923).
He was an unsuccessful candidate for reelection in 1922 to the Sixty-eighth Congress.

Later career and death 
He resumed manufacturing activities.
He died in Wabash, Indiana, November 18, 1942.
He was interred in Mount Hope Cemetery, Peru, Indiana.

See also 
List of Jewish members of the United States Congress

References

 
 
 

1866 births
1942 deaths
People from Kokomo, Indiana
American people of German-Jewish descent
American military personnel of the Spanish–American War
University of Michigan Law School alumni
Jewish American people in Indiana politics
Jewish members of the United States House of Representatives
Republican Party members of the United States House of Representatives from Indiana

1908 United States presidential electors